Filip Babić (born 25 May 1995) is a Serbian football defender who plays for TSC Bačka Topola.

Club career

Career statistics

References

External links
 

1995 births
Living people
Sportspeople from Užice
Association football defenders
Serbian footballers
FK Sloboda Užice players
FK Proleter Novi Sad players
FK Vojvodina players
FK TSC Bačka Topola players
Serbian First League players
Serbian SuperLiga players